Raúl Palma Canno (born 16 April 1950) is a Mexican former basketball player and coach. In 2001 and 2002 he coached Gallos de Pelea de Ciudad Juárez of the Liga Nacional de Baloncesto Profesional.

References

1950 births
Living people
Mexican men's basketball players
1967 FIBA World Championship players
1974 FIBA World Championship players
Basketball players at the 1967 Pan American Games
Basketball players at the 1971 Pan American Games
Basketball players at the 1975 Pan American Games
Pan American Games medalists in basketball
Pan American Games silver medalists for Mexico
Medalists at the 1967 Pan American Games